The following is a list of awards received by Vishnuvardhan throughout his acting career.
Filmfare Awards South
Filmfare Award for Best Kannada Actor - 4 times:
 Naagarahaavu - 1973 Special Award
 Bandhana - 1984 Special Award
 Suprabhatha - 1988 Best Actor
 Haalunda Thavaru - 1994 (Best Actor)
 Yajamana - 2000 (Best Actor)
 Apthamitra - 2004 (Best Actor)
 Filmfare Lifetime Achievement Award - 2002.

Karnataka State Film Awards
Karnataka State Film Awards for the Best Actor Category: Seven Times
 Naagarahaavu – 1972-73
 Hombisilu – 1977-78
 Bandhana – 1984-85
 Lion Jagapathi Rao – 1990-91
 Laali – 1997-98
 Veerappa Nayaka – 1998-99
 Aaptha Rakshaka – 2009-10 (Posthumously)
 Lifetime achievement Award Dr. Rajkumar Award - 2008

Cinema Express Awards
Cinema Express Awards for the Best Actor Category:
 Suprabhatha – 1988 - (Best Actor)
 Rayaru Bandaru Mavana Manege – 1993 - (Best Actor)
 Yajamana – 2000 - (Best Actor)

Other awards
 Honorary Doctorate awarded by Bangalore University in 2005
 Aragini Reader's Award
 Suvarna Lifetime Achievement Award for Contribution To Kannada Cinema 2008
 Tarangini Berkley Award
 Indira Pratishtana National Award
 V Shantaram award Best Actor for Parva
 Kaladevi Award (Chennai)
Suvarna Film Award for Favorite Hero 2011
Madras Films Association Award
Kerala Cultural And Art Award
Rajyotsava Award - 1990
R.N.R Award
Videocon Suprabhata Film Viewers Award
Maharaja of Hot Rain Songs by Indian Gilma Society

References

Vishnuvardhan